Nughab (also Romanized as Nūghāb, Naughāb, Nooghab, Nowghāb, Nowqāb, and Nūqāb) is a village in Nughab Rural District of the Central District of Darmian County, South Khorasan province, Iran. At the 2006 National Census, its population was 3,198 in 742 households. The following census in 2011 counted 3,342 people in 851 households. The latest census in 2016 showed a population of 3,520 people in 927 households; it was the largest village in its rural district. After the census, the village became the capital of the newly formed Nughab Rural District.

References 

Darmian County

Populated places in South Khorasan Province

Populated places in Darmian County